Jang Hye-ock (born 9 February 1977) is a badminton player from South Korea who affiliate with Chungnam Provincial office team. She won the gold medal at the 1995 IBF World Championships in women's doubles, playing with Gil Young-ah. At 18 years, 3 months, and 19 days, she was the youngest player ever to win a World Championship title, in any discipline. The same year she won the 1995 All England Open Badminton Championships. She reached a career high as women's doubles world number 1 with Gil in August 1995. Jang competed at the 1996 Summer Olympics, and she won the silver medal in the women's doubles together with Gil Young-ah.

Career 
Jang Hye-ock entered the national team in 1993 when she was in the second grade of Seongshim Girls' High School. Although she has a small physique, Jang was excellent as a play-maker, supporting her power and spirit to compete. In February 1996, she undergo surgery for an enlarged rib and after recovered her injury, she competed at the 1996 Summer Olympics, won a silver medal in the women's doubles with Gil Young-ah.

In 1998, after playing two tournaments in Europe, she suffered a hip injury, and then she decided to leave the national team and the international tournaments. After her retirement, she keeps playing domestically for her local team and later for Jeonbuk Bank. She is now coaching in her alma mater, Seongshim Girls' High School. She did also coach the national junior team for about 3 years, back when Lee Yong-dae was on the team.

Achievements

Olympic Games 
Women's doubles

World Championships 
Women's doubles

Asian Games 
Women's doubles

Mixed doubles

Asian Championships 
Women's doubles

Mixed doubles

Asian Cup 
Women's doubles

Mixed doubles

IBF World Grand Prix 
The World Badminton Grand Prix sanctioned by International Badminton Federation (IBF) since 1983.

Women's doubles

Mixed doubles

References

External links 
 
 
 
 

1977 births
Living people
People from Jeonju
Sportspeople from North Jeolla Province
South Korean female badminton players
Badminton players at the 1996 Summer Olympics
Olympic badminton players of South Korea
Olympic silver medalists for South Korea
Olympic medalists in badminton
Medalists at the 1996 Summer Olympics
Badminton players at the 1994 Asian Games
Asian Games gold medalists for South Korea
Asian Games silver medalists for South Korea
Asian Games medalists in badminton
Medalists at the 1994 Asian Games
World No. 1 badminton players
Badminton coaches